John William Fuqua (born September 12, 1947), nicknamed "Frenchy", is a former professional American football running back who played from 1969 to 1976, for the New York Giants and Pittsburgh Steelers of the National Football League (NFL) and the New York Stars of the World Football League (WFL).

Biography
John Fuqua was born in Detroit, Michigan, on September 12, 1947. A 1965 graduate of Detroit's Eastern High School, Fuqua played college football at Morgan State University and was drafted in the eleventh round of the 1969 NFL Draft by the New York Giants. The next season, Fuqua was traded to the Pittsburgh Steelers.  It was while with the Steelers that Fuqua would become part of NFL history as the intended target for Terry Bradshaw's pass that resulted in the Immaculate Reception.  Oakland Raiders safety Jack Tatum hit Fuqua just as the ball arrived.  It has never been established whether the ball hit Fuqua or Tatum.  This was critical, since under the rules of the time, once a pass touched an offensive player he was the only one eligible to catch the pass.  If the ball had hit Fuqua without touching Tatum, the rules called for the play to be blown dead once Franco Harris touched the ball.  Fuqua reportedly insists to this day that he knows whom the ball hit first, but will never tell.

Fuqua nicknamed himself "The French Count".  He is remembered for being one of the flashiest dressers in the NFL, and would occasionally appear in public wearing platform shoes having see-through heels that contained water and a live tropical fish selected from his aquarium to match the color of the day's outfit. He won two Super Bowl titles during his Steelers tenure, which were also the first two championships in the team's history.
  
Over the course of his career, Fuqua played in 100 games, rushing for 3,031 yards and scoring 24 touchdowns.  His best season was in 1970, his first with the Steelers, when he rushed for 691 yards and seven touchdowns. In this season, he set a then Steelers single-game rushing record of 218 yards against the Philadelphia Eagles.  This was later surpassed in 2006 by Willie Parker when he gained 223 yards against the Cleveland Browns.

Teammate Franco Harris had his fanclub "Franco's Italian Army", and Fuqua had "Frenchy's Foreign Legion".

In celebration of the 35th Anniversary of the Immaculate Reception, Fuqua created a candy bar called "The Immaculate Confection".

In popular culture

In Episode 31 of the fantasy comedy television series The Good Place, demon Michael, while visiting Earth, tells people that his assistant Janet is named Lisa "Frenchy" Fuqua.

References 

1946 births
Living people
American football running backs
Martin Luther King High School (Detroit) alumni
Players of American football from Detroit
Pittsburgh Steelers players
New York Giants players
Morgan State Bears football players